The fourth event of the 2022 Curling Stadium Alberta Curling Series was held from November 4 to 6 at the Leduc Recreation Centre in Leduc, Alberta. It was the fourth of five men's and women's events held as part of the Alberta Curling Series for the 2022–23 curling season. The total purse for the event was $5,000 on the men's side and $6,250 on the women's side.

The event was sponsored by Curling Stadium, a streaming service provided by CurlingZone. All of the games were streamed on CurlingZone and the Alberta Curling Series' YouTube page.

Men

Teams
The teams are listed as follows:

Round robin standings
Final Round Robin Standings

Round robin results 
All draw times are listed in Mountain Time (UTC−06:00).

Draw 1
Friday, November 4, 4:00 pm

Draw 3
Saturday, November 5, 10:00 am

Draw 4
Saturday, November 5, 4:00 pm

Playoffs

Source:

Semifinals
Sunday, November 6, 12:00 pm

Final
Sunday, November 6, 3:00 pm

Women

Teams
The teams are listed as follows:

Round robin standings
Final Round Robin Standings

Round robin results 
All draw times are listed in Mountain Time (UTC−06:00).

Draw 1
Friday, November 4, 4:00 pm

Draw 2
Friday, November 4, 7:30 pm

Draw 3
Saturday, November 5, 10:00 am

Draw 4
Saturday, November 5, 4:00 pm

Draw 5
Saturday, November 5, 7:30 pm

Tiebreaker
Sunday, November 6, 9:00 am

Playoffs

Source:

Semifinals
Sunday, November 6, 12:00 pm

Final
Sunday, November 6, 3:00 pm

Notes

References

External links
Official Website
Men's Event
Women's Event

2022 in Canadian curling
2022 in curling
Curling in Alberta
November 2022 sports events in Canada
2022 in Alberta
Leduc, Alberta